Bertholdia flavilucens is a moth of the family Erebidae. It was described by Schaus in 1920. It is found in Guatemala.

References

Phaegopterina
Moths described in 1920